Knattspyrnufélag Akureyrar, abbreviated KA, is an Icelandic multi-sport club based in Akureyri in the north of Iceland. The club was founded in 1928. The football team currently plays in Besta deild karla and have won the top flight once in 1989.

Club
The club offers various sports including football, handball, judo, volleyball and racket sports. Its main rival is another sports club in Akureyri, Þór Akureyri. The two clubs merged to form ÍB Akureyri from 1928 to 1974. Before the 2006–2007 Icelandic handball season, they merged their handball clubs to form Akureyri Handboltafélag. In 2017, KA left the partnership and reinstated the KA Handball section.

Football

Men's football
They have once been the Icelandic champions, in 1989 after a tough fight against FH (Fimleikafélag Hafnarfjarðar). FH were in the lead until their final match, against already relegated team Fylkir. FH lost and KA obtained the title for the first time in their history.

KA formerly played at Akureyrarvöllur close to downtown Akureyri but have since moved all games to Greifavöllurinn, a temporary arena at the club's training base, KA-Heimilið in the Lundarhverfi neighborhood where a new permanent stadium is also being built.

Current squad 

 

(captain)

Out on loan

European record

Matches 

Notes
 PR: Preliminary Round
 1R: First round
 1Q: First qualifying round
 2Q: Second qualifying round
 3Q: Third qualifying round
 PO: Play-off round

Recent history 
{|class="wikitable"
|-bgcolor="#efefef"
! Season
!
! Pos.
! Pl.
! W
! D
! L
! GS
! GA
! P
!Cup
!Notes
|-
|1987
|Úrvalsdeild
| align="right" |6
|align="right" |18|| align="right" |5||align="right" |6|| align="right" |7
|align="right" |18|| align="right" |17|| align="right" |21
|Fourth round
|
|-
|1988
|Úrvalsdeild
| align="right" |4
|align="right" |18|| align="right" |8||align="right" |3|| align="right" |7
|align="right" |31|| align="right" |29|| align="right" |27
|Fourth round
|
|-
|1989
|Úrvalsdeild
| align="right" bgcolor=gold|1
|align="right" |18|| align="right" |9||align="right" |7|| align="right" |2
|align="right" |29|| align="right" |15|| align="right" |34
|Fourth round
|
|-
|1990
|Úrvalsdeild
| align="right" |8
|align="right" |18|| align="right" |5|| align="right" |1|| align="right" |12
|align="right" |18|| align="right" |28|| align="right" |16
|Fourth round
|European Cup
|-
|1991
|Úrvalsdeild
| align="right" |6
|align="right" |18|| align="right" |7|| align="right" |4|| align="right" |7
|align="right" |21|| align="right" |23|| align="right" |25
|Fourth round
|
|-
|1992
|Úrvalsdeild
| align="right" bgcolor="#FFCCCC"|10
|align="right" |18|| align="right" |3|| align="right" |4|| align="right" |11
|align="right" |18|| align="right" |33|| align="right" |13
|bgcolor=silver|Final
|Relegated to the 1.deild
|-
|1993
|1.deild
| align="right" |4
|align="right" |18|| align="right" |9||align="right" |2||align="right" |7
|align="right" |31|| align="right" |22||align="right" |29
|Fourth round
|
|-
|1994
|1.deild
| align="right" |8
| align="right" |18|| align="right" |5|| align="right" |3|| align="right" |10
| align="right" |26|| align="right" |34|| align="right" |18
|Third round
|
|-
|1995
|1.deild
| align="right" |3
| align="right" |18|| align="right" |7|| align="right" |6|| align="right" |5
| align="right" |26|| align="right" |25|| align="right" |27
|Second round
|
|-
|1996
|1.deild
|align=right|4
|align=right|18|| align="right" |7|| align="right" |5|| align="right" |6
|align=right|36|| align="right" |33|| align="right" |26
|Quarter-finals
|
|-
|1997
|1.deild
|align=right|7
|align=right|18|| align="right" |4|| align="right" |6|| align="right" |8
|align=right|24|| align="right" |31|| align="right" |18
|Fourth round
|
|-
|1998
|1.deild
|align=right |7
|align=right|18|| align="right" |7|| align="right" |4|| align="right" |7
|align=right|24|| align="right" |28|| align="right" |25
||Third round
|
|-
|1999
|1.deild
|align=right |6
|align=right|18|| align="right" |6|| align="right" |5|| align="right" |7
|align=right|24|| align="right" |24|| align="right" |23
||Second round
|
|-
|2000
|1.deild
|align=right |3
|align=right|18|| align="right" |10|| align="right" |4|| align="right" |4
|align=right|38|| align="right" |23|| align="right" |34
||Fourth round
|
|-
|2001
|1.deild
|align=right bgcolor=#DDFFDD| 2
|align=right|18|| align="right" |11|| align="right" |4|| align="right" |3
|align=right|43|| align="right" |21|| align="right" |37
|bgcolor=silver|Final
|Promoted to the Úrvalsdeild
|-
|2002
|Úrvalsdeild
|align=right |4
|align=right|18|| align="right" |6|| align="right" |7|| align="right" |5
|align=right|18|| align="right" |19|| align="right" |25
|Semi-finals
|
|-
|2003
|Úrvalsdeild
|align=right |8
|align=right|18|| align="right" |6|| align="right" |4|| align="right" |8
|align=right|29|| align="right" |27|| align="right" |22
||Semi-finals
|UEFA Intertoto Cup
|-
|2004
|Úrvalsdeild
|align=right bgcolor="#FFCCCC"| 10
|align=right|18|| align="right" |4|| align="right" |3|| align="right" |11
|align=right|13|| align="right" |30|| align="right" |15
|bgcolor=silver|Final
|Relegated to the 1.deild
|-
|2005
|1. deild
|align=right |3
|align=right|18|| align="right" |10|| align="right" |4|| align="right" |4
|align=right|40|| align="right" |20|| align="right" |34
||Fourth round
|
|-
|2006
|1. deild
|align=right |6
|align=right|18|| align="right" |6|| align="right" |3|| align="right" |9
|align=right|22|| align="right" |25|| align="right" |21
||Quarter-finals
|
|-
|2007
|1. deild
|align=right |11
|align=right|22|| align="right" |5|| align="right" |4|| align="right" |13
|align=right|14|| align="right" |45|| align="right" |19
|Third round
|
|-
|2008
|1. deild
|align=right |4
|align=right|22|| align="right" |9|| align="right" |5|| align="right" |8
|align=right|31|| align="right" |27|| align="right" |32
|Third round
|
|-
|-
|2009
|1. deild
|align=right |5
|align=right|22|| align="right" |10|| align="right" |5|| align="right" |7
|align=right|32|| align="right" |24|| align="right" |35
|Fourth round
|
|-
|-
|2010
|1. deild
|align=right |9
|align=right|22|| align="right" |6|| align="right" |6|| align="right" |10
|align=right|29|| align="right" |43|| align="right" |24
|Quarter-finals
|
|-
|-
|2011
|1. deild
|align=right |8
|align=right|22|| align="right" |9|| align="right" |2|| align="right" |11
|align=right|32|| align="right" |40|| align="right" |29
|Third round
|
|-
|2012
|1. deild
|align=right |4
|align=right|22|| align="right" |9|| align="right" |6|| align="right" |7
|align=right|34|| align="right" |30|| align="right" |33
|Fourth round
|
|-
|2013
|1. deild
|align=right |6
|align=right|22|| align="right" |9|| align="right" |5|| align="right" |8
|align=right|38|| align="right" |31|| align="right" |32
|Second round
|
|-
|2014
|1. deild
|align=right |8
|align=right|22|| align="right" |8|| align="right" |7|| align="right" |7
|align=right|42|| align="right" |33|| align="right" |31
|Third round
|
|-
|2015
|1. deild
|align=right |3
|align=right|22|| align="right" |12|| align="right" |5||align=right|5
|align=right|42|| align="right" |22|| align="right" |41
|Semi-final
|
|-
|2016 
|1. deild
|align=right bgcolor=#DDFFDD| 1
|align=right|22||align=right|16|| align="right" |3|| align="right" |3
|align=right|42|| align="right" |16|| align="right" |51
||Third round
|Promoted to the Úrvalsdeild
|-
|2017 
|Úrvalsdeild
|align=right |7
|align=right|22||align=right|7|| align="right" |8|| align="right" |7
|align=right|37|| align="right" |31|| align="right" |29
||Third round
|
|-
|2018 
|Úrvalsdeild
|align=right |7
|align=right|22||align=right|7|| align="right" |7|| align="right" |8
|align=right|36|| align="right" |34|| align="right" |28
||Fourth round
|
|-
|2019 
|Úrvalsdeild
|align=right |5
|align=right|22||align=right|9|| align="right" |4|| align="right" |9
|align=right|34|| align="right" |34|| align="right" |31
||Fourth round
|
|-
|2020 
|Úrvalsdeild
|align=right |7
|align=right|18||align=right|3|| align="right" |12|| align="right" |3
|align=right|20|| align="right" |21|| align="right" |21
||Fourth round
|*Season not completed due to COVID-19
|-
|2021 
|Úrvalsdeild
|align=right |4
|align=right|22||align=right|12|| align="right" |4|| align="right" |6
|align=right|36|| align="right" |20|| align="right" |40
||Fourth round
|
|}

Trophies and achievements 
Icelandic Champion:
 Gold medal: 1989
Icelandic Cup:
Runners-up: 1992, 2001, 2004
Icelandic League Cup:
Runners-up: 2015
Icelandic Super Cup:
Champions: 1990

Notable former players 
  Þorvaldur Örlygsson
  Erlingur Kristjánsson
  Þorvaldur Makan Sigbjörnsson
  Hreinn Hringsson
  Dean Martin
  Sandor Matus
  Pálmi Rafn Pálmason
  Atli Sveinn Þórarinsson
  Haukur Heiðar Hauksson
  Brynjar Ingi Bjarnason

Player of the Season

Overall most appearances

Overall top scorers

Managerial History

 Einar Helgason (1975–76)
 Jóhannes Atlason (1977–79)
 Alex Willoughby (1980–82)
 Fritz Kissing (1983)
 Gústaf Baldvinsson (1984-1986)
 Hörður Helgason (1987)
 Guðjón Þórðarson (1988-1990)
 Ormar Örlygsson (1991)
 Gunnar Gíslason (1992)
 Njáll Eiðsson (1993)
 Erlingur Kristjánsson (1994)
 Pétur Ormslev (1995-1996)
 Sigurður Kristján Lárusson (1997)
 Einar Einarsson (1998-1999)
 Þorvaldur Örlygsson (2000-2005)
 Slobodan Milisic (2006-2007)
 Pétur Ólafsson (2007)
 Dean Martin (2008-2010)
 Gunnlaugur Jónsson (2011-2012)
 Bjarni Jóhannsson (2013-2015)
 Srdjan Tufegdzic (2015-2018)
 Óli Stefán Flóventsson (2019-2020)
 Arnar Grétarsson (2020- 2022)
 Hallgrímur Jónasson] (2022- present)

Kit

Women's Football

Since 1999, KA has fielded a joint women's team with neighbouring club Þór Akureyri under the name Þór/KA in the top-level league Úrvalsdeild. In 2006 the team finished 7th of 8 teams, 8th/9 in 2007, the reaching a good 4th/10 in 2008 and then bettering those results with 3rd/10 in 2009 and a second-place finish in 2010. As Iceland was in the top 8 leagues of UEFA, those second place was enough to qualify for the 2011–12 UEFA Women's Champions League. The team entered in the round of 32 but lost 14–2 on aggregate to German team Turbine Potsdam.

In 2010 the team also went to the semi-finals in the Icelandic cup, losing to the eventual winner Valur. In 1989 and 2013 they lost the cup final.

In 2012 Þór/KA finished first in the Úrvalsdeild and secured its first ever Icelandic championship.

On September 29, 2017, the club secured its second national championship by defeating FH, in the last game of the season, 2–0 with goals from Sandra Jessen and Sandra Stephany Mayor.

Trophies and achievements 
Úrvalsdeild kvenna (2):
20121, 20171
Icelandic Women's Football Cup:
Runner-up: 20131
Icelandic Division I (2):
19922, 19991

 As Þór/KA
 As KA

Handball

Men's handball

Trophies and achievements
Icelandic Championships:
 Gold medal: 1997, 2002
Icelandic Cup:
Champions: 1995, 1996, 2004
Icelandic League Cup:
Champions: 1996, 1998, 2001

Women's handball

Trophies and achievements
Icelandic championship:
 Gold medal:2021
Icelandic Cup
 Gold medal:2021
Icelandic Super Cup:
 Gold medal:2020
1. deild kvenna:
 Gold medal: 2018

Volleyball

Trophies and achievements

Men's volleyball
Icelandic Championships:
 Gold medal: 1989, 1991, 2010, 2011, 2018, 2019
Icelandic Cup:
Champions: 1991, 1992, 2010, 2011, 2012, 2015, 2016, 2018, 2019
Icelandic League Cup:
Champions: 1989, 1991, 1994, 2010, 2011, 2018, 2019

Women's volleyball
Icelandic Championships:
 Gold medal: 2019
Icelandic Cup:
Champions: 2019
Icelandic League Cup:
Champions: 2019

Club officials 
As of 22 August 2022

Current technical body

Club Board

Football Board

References

External links
Official website (Icelandic)
supporters site (Icelandic)

 
Football clubs in Iceland
Multi-sport clubs in Iceland
Association football clubs established in 1928
1928 establishments in Iceland
Sport in Akureyri